The Silver Lining is a 1921 American silent drama film directed by Roland West. It is not known whether the film currently survives.

Plot
While discussing heredity, a man recalls the story of two orphan girls to a pair of cohorts at a ball. Angel (Carmen) is adopted by crooks who teach her to steal, while Evelyn (Valli) is the criminally inclined girl adopted by a wealthy family. When Angel steals a watch from a passenger on the train, the man refuses to press charges and enlists her help in his confidence scheme in Havana. Evelyn is engaged to marry the promising author Robert Ellington (Austin), but after a quarrel, the writer goes to Havana and meets and falls for Angel. Ellington is scheduled to leave on a ship but gives his ticket to Johnson (Albertson), the secret agent and con man. Angel watches tearfully as the boat pulls away before Ellington reveals he loves her, and the two are left in happiness. The film ends as the story teller turning and pointing out the couple dancing at the ball.

Cast
Coit Albertson.....George Johnson
Jewel Carmen.....The Angel
Leslie Austin.....Robert Ellington
Virginia Valli.....Evelyn Schofield
Theodore Babcock.....Eugene Narcom
Marie Coverdale.....Mrs. George Schofield
Edwards Davis.....George Schofield
Dorothy Dickson.....Dancer
Arthur Donaldson.....Friend of the Baxters
Paul Everton.....Detective
J. Herbert Frank.....Big Joe	
Julia Swayne Gordon.....Gentle Annie
Carl Hyson.....Dancer
Gladden James.....Billy Dean
Jule Powers.....Mrs. Baxte
Henry Sedley.....Mr. Baxter
Charles Wellesley.....Burton Hardy

References

External links

1921 films
1921 drama films
Silent American drama films
American silent feature films
American black-and-white films
Films directed by Roland West
Metro Pictures films
1920s American films